The Workhorse Chronicles is a DVD by American metal band Mastodon chronicling the first half-decade of the band's history. It was released on February 21, 2006 through Relapse Records.

Content
The DVD is divided into three sections. The first section is a documentary that traces the process of band's formation and also provides information about previous bands of individual members. The second section consists of 28 live performances recorded from 2000 to 2005 and includes rare footage of the band in their initial form as a five-piece. The third section features the band's first three music videos: "March Of The Fire Ants", "Blood and Thunder", and "Iron Tusk". The DVD was originally going to contain alternate videos for some songs (including "Battle At Sea" and "Seabeast") that focused entirely upon drummer Brann Dailor; however, for some unknown reason, these "drum-cam" videos were not included.

Personnel
Brann Dailor – drums
Brent Hinds – guitar, vocals
Bill Kelliher – guitar, backing vocals
Troy Sanders – bass, vocals
 Eric Saner – vocals (tracks 7, 8, and 10)

Track listing

The Evolution of Mastodon
Introduction to Mastodon
Profiling Mastodon
Pre-Mastodon
Formation of Mastodon
Mastodon Environment
Roar of Mastodon

Live performances
Deep Sea Creature (May 2000, Tallahassee, FL)
Slick Leg (May 2000, Tallahassee, FL)
Thank You For This (2002, Atlanta, GA)
Call Of The Mastodon (May 2000, Tallahassee, FL)
Shadows That Move (Summer 2001, Baltimore, MD)
Battle At Sea (Summer 2002, Baltimore, MD)
Hail To Fire (April 2005, Los Angeles, CA)
We Built This Come Death (2002, Atlanta GA)
Welcoming War (Summer 2002, Baltimore, MD)
Burning Man (2002, Atlanta GA)
Crusher Destroyer (May 2005, Atlanta, GA)
March Of The Fire Ants (April 2005, Los Angeles, CA)
Mother Puncher (Summer 2005, With Full Force Festival, Germany)
Ol’e Nessie (2002, Atlanta, GA)
Trainwreck (January 2001, Atlanta, GA)
Trampled Under Hoof (2002, Atlanta, GA)
Trilobite (May 2003, Memphis, TN)
Where Strides The Behemoth (September 2005, Atlanta, GA)
Workhorse (2004, Hellfest)
Megalodon (May 2005, Atlanta, GA)
Aqua Dementia (Summer 2005, Denver, CO)
Blood & Thunder (September 2005, Atlanta, GA)
Hearts Alive (April 2005, Los Angeles, CA)
I Am Ahab (September 2005, Atlanta, GA)
Iron Tusk (May 2005, Atlanta, GA)
Ísland (September 2005, Atlanta, GA)
Naked Burn (February 2004, Philadelphia, PA)
Seabeast (June 2004, London, UK)

The Videos
Creating the Videos
March of the Fire Ants (Extended Version)
Iron Tusk (Uncensored Version)
Blood and Thunder

Notes

References

External links
 The Workhorse Chronicles release page on Discogs

2006 video albums
Relapse Records video albums
Live video albums
Relapse Records live albums
2006 live albums
Mastodon (band) albums